Damal Krishnaswamy Pattammal (19 March 1919 – 16 July 2009), popularly known as D. K. Pattammal or DKP, was an Indian Carnatic musician and a playback singer for film songs in Tamil. Pattammal, along with her contemporaries M. S. Subbulakshmi and M. L. Vasanthakumari, are popularly referred to as the female trinity of Carnatic Music. This trio initiated the entry of women into mainstream Carnatic Music. She has been appreciated all over the world by Carnatic music lovers.

Early life and background
Pattammal was born in a Brahmin family in Kancheepuram of Tamil Nadu, India. She was named Alamelu, but fondly called "Patta" as a child prodigy. Her father, Damal Krishnaswamy Dikshithar, who was deeply interested in music, inspired her to learn Carnatic music. Her mother, Kanthimathi (Rajammal), although a talented singer herself, was not permitted to sing even for friends or relatives in line with strict orthodox tradition. Despite her orthodox background, Pattammal sang and showed considerable music talent at an early age. Her parents initiated her into devotional singing.

Pattammal did not receive formal training in a systematic manner beginning with the basics. She also did not receive regular gurukula training; in accordance with those times, women, especially from conservative families, were constrained from attending gurukula training.  She initially received tuition from an unnamed Telugu-speaking musician, whom she called "Telugu vadyar" or "Telugu teacher", who also taught her Telugu and Sanskrit. She later learnt music from her mother, some disciples of C Subramanya Pillai (popularly known as Naina Pillai), as well as Rajalakshmi, daughter of Veena Dhanammal. Pattammal also learnt from Ambi Dikshitar, a grandson of prolific composer Muthuswamy Dikshitar. Pattammal subsequently continued learning compositions of Dikshitar from musicologist and former Supreme Court judge, T. L. Venkatarama Iyer. She also studied directly under Papanasam Sivan, a prolific Tamil composer.

As a child, Pattammal sat through Carnatic music concerts, and on returning home, notated the kritis she heard, and key phrases of ragas. Her brothers D. K. Ranganathan, D. K. Nagarajan, and D. K. Jayaraman – later her vocal accompanists, helped her in this task. She also sang simple devotional hymns and songs her father taught her. There was no radio or recorded music which was available in those times.

After she married R. Iswaran in 1939, Pattammal continued her pursuit in music while fulfilling the domestic duties of a traditional housewife, getting up as early as 4am to begin her day.

Singing career
At age eight, Pattammal won first prize for singing Thyagaraja's "Raksha Bettare" in Bhairavi, at a competition conducted by C Subramanya Pillai (popularly known as Naina Pillai), whom Pattammal admired deeply. According to Pattammal, Naina Pillai would host Thyagaraja Utsavams (festivals dedicated to Tyagaraja) in Kancheepuram every year, and was a veteran in the art of singing Ragam Thanam Pallavi.

In 1929, at age 10, Pattammal gave her first radio performance for Madras Corporation Radio (now known as AIR). In 1933, at age 13, Pattammal gave a full-length public concert at Madras Rasika Ranjani Sabha; she is considered the first woman from a Brahmin-caste family to do so. In the same year, her music was first captured in recording discs by the Columbia Company, as it was then known. One year later, she moved to Chennai to become a regular performer in concerts and gave her first performance at the Mahila Samajam (the Egmore Ladies Club), and won acclaim. She quickly rose to stardom, and her musical career spanned more than 65 years. In 1936, she gave her maiden performance at the Madras Music Academy.

D. K. Pattammal's knowledge was encyclopaedic; she was considered as an authority on Muthuswami Dikshitar's compositions, and is also known for her renditions of these. She learnt authentic versions of these compositions from Ambi Dikshitar, a descendant of Muthuswami Dikshitar, as well as Justice T. L. Venkatrama Iyer, an authority on Dikshithar's compositions. She popularised several Dikshithar's compositions in her concerts, and also sang Tiruppugazhs and Tevarams that she learnt from Appadurai Achari. Pattammal also learnt many compositions of Papanasam Sivan, directly from the composer himself. She went on to popularise these compositions of Papanasam Sivan, as well as those of Subramania Bharathiyar, both in film and Carnatic music.

Pattammal started a few revolutionary trends in Carnatic music. She was the first Brahmin woman to have performed this genre of music publicly. Brahmins ranked as the highest in the caste hierarchy prevalent in India in the early 20th century, and society considered it taboo for a Brahmin woman to perform on stage.

Pattammal was also the first woman to have performed Ragam Thanam Pallavi in concerts. Ragam Thanam Pallavi, which was classed as a male stronghold, is the most difficult concert item in Carnatic music, as it calls for great skill and a high degree of concentration to handle the rhythmic complexities involved. Pattammal went further to perform very complex Pallavis in intricate talas (rhythmic cycles); impressing and earning the respect of her male peers, connoisseurs and fellow-musicians. Her singing of pallavis was technically perfect, and aesthetically pleasing. For this reason, she became dubbed "Pallavi Pattammal". She learnt a few pallavis and compositions from Naina Pillai, and several from Vidyala Narasimhalu Naidu, the nephew of Tirupati Narayanaswami Naidu, a prominent composer of javalis. Today, many female Carnatic musicians perform Ragam Thanam Pallavi as the main item in their concerts.

Films
Pattammal was one of the earliest Carnatic musicians to sing in films, and was introduced in this medium by Papanasam Sivan. Although she received many offers to sing for films, she only accepted those that involved devotional or patriotic songs, and declined offers to sing romantic songs. The first film Pattammal sang in was Thyagabhoomi (1939). A scene, towards the end of the film, showed a group of freedom fighters marching in a procession, carrying the Indian National Congress party flag, with "Desa Sevai Seyya Vaareer" being sung by Pattammal in the background. The song, written by Kalki (R. Krishnamurthy) and tuned by Papanasam Sivan, highlighted the Freedom Movement and invited people to join. The fame that the film and the song generated led to both being banned by the British government.

Pattammal popularised several patriotic compositions of Subramania Bharathiyar. In Naam Iruvar (1947), her renditions of "Vetri Ettu Dhikkum Etta", and "Aaduvome Pallu-p- Paduvome", a remarkably prescient creation celebrating a free India, went on to be big hits. In Raama Raajyam (1948), Pattammal popularised Subramania Bharathi's "Thoondir Puzhvinai-p-pol", and she made his composition, "Theeradha Vilayattu Pillai",  Vedhala Ulagam (1948) a favourite with listeners. Pattammaal's singing, along with the dancing of Baby Kamala in the film, made the latter of these especially memorable. In AVM's Vaazhkai (1949 film), where Vyjayanthimala was introduced to film acting, Pattammaal sang the nationalist poet's "Bharatha Samudhaayam Vaazhgave". Pattammal also had the rare honour of performing at the foundation-laying ceremony of the Bharathi Memorial at Ettayapuram.

Pattammal sang in other films including Mahatma Urangaar (1947), Pizhaikkum Vazhi (1948), Laavanya (1951). The last song Pattammaal sang in film was at the age of 80 for the Tamil film, Hey Ram (2000). Ilaiyaraaja and Kamal Haasan carted recording equipment to her home and had her sing "Vaishnav Janato", a favourite of Mahatma Gandhi, for the film.

Pattammal was one of the artists in Jana Gana Mana video album composed by A. R. Rahman which was released on 26 January 2000 to mark the 50th year of the Indian Republic. Pattammaal who, at 80, was senior-most among the rest of the other vocal artists in this video album.

Tours

Pattammaal has performed in all major states, sabhaas and venues throughout India, as well as numerous destinations around the world, including the United States, Canada, France, Germany, Switzerland, Sri Lanka and other countries.

Disciples
Pattammal's style of singing attracted many students, foremost among them her younger brother D. K. Jayaraman, who sang with her in several concerts, and who himself received the Sangeetha Kalanidhi in 1990. A few of her other popular students include her daughter-in-law Lalitha Sivakumar, Sushila Raman, grand daughter Gayathri SundaraRaman, Geetha Rajashekar, her granddaughter Nithyasree Mahadevan, her great-granddaughter Lavanya Sundararaman, Aishwarya Srinivas  and her Malaysian, Chinese student/adopted grandson Chong Chiu Sen (Sai Madhana Mohan Kumar) from Malaysia.

Death
Pattammal died of natural causes in Chennai on 16 July 2009 at 1:30 pm. She was survived by her two sons I. Sivakumar and I. Lakshmankumar, as well as her grandchildren Rajguru, Gayathri, Nithyasree, and Charan. Her husband, R. Iswaran, died on 2 April 2010, aged 95.

Awards and titles
D. K. Pattammal received several awards and titles throughout her career, including:

 Sangeet Natak Akademi Award (1961)
 Sangeetha Kalanidhi (1970; highest accolade in Carnatic music)
 Padma Bhushan (1971; from the Government of India)
 Sangeetha Kalasikhamani (1978) by The Indian Fine Arts Society, Chennai.
 Fellow of Sangeet Natak Akademi (elected in 1992)
 Padma Vibhushan (1998; India's second-highest civilian honour)
 Postage stamp from India Post (2014)

References

External links

DK Pattammal — fave of Carnatic for 7 decades, with no lineage, no tutelage

1919 births
2009 deaths
Women Carnatic singers
Carnatic singers
Recipients of the Padma Bhushan in arts
Recipients of the Padma Vibhushan in arts
Performers of Hindu music
Recipients of the Sangeet Natak Akademi Award
Recipients of the Sangeet Natak Akademi Fellowship
Sangeetha Kalanidhi recipients
People from Kanchipuram district
20th-century Indian singers
Singers from Tamil Nadu
Indian women classical singers
20th-century Indian women singers
21st-century Indian women singers
21st-century Indian singers
Women musicians from Tamil Nadu
Kanchipuram